Laura Mancinelli  (18 December 1933 – 7 July 2016) was an Italian writer, germanist, medievalist and university professor.

Mancinelli also wrote academic texts, children's books, essays (numerous of medieval history), and historical novels.

Life 

Laura Mancinelli was born in Udine in 1933, then, after a period of short stays between Rovereto and Mantua where she spent her early childhood, in 1937 the family moved permanently to Turin.

After her school education and studies, she graduated from the University of Turin in 1956 with a degree in german literature with a focus on modern literature.

In the years following her doctorate she taught without ever giving up her passion for medieval german culture. In 1969 she wrote the essay The Song of the Nibelungs. Problems and values.

In the 1970s she taught germanic philology at the University of Sassari and then called in Venice by the Germanist , in 1976 she founded the Department of History of German Language at the University of Venice.

In the early 1990s, affected by multiple sclerosis, Laura Mancinelli left the Chair of german philology.

Mancinelli died on 7 July 2016 in Turin as a result of her illness.
The farewell ceremony took place on 11 July 2016 in the monumental cemetery of Turin; the funeral took place in Exilles in the Susa Valley, where the writer had set one of her novels.

Career

Writing career 
After returning to Turin as holder of the University Chair of germanic philology, in 1981 Laura Mancinelli made her debut in fiction, publishing, The Twelve Abbots of Challant (winner the same year of the Mondello Prize), a historical novel that the author had begun to write in 1968. After came Il fantasma di Mozart in 1986 and The Miracle of Saint Odilia in 1989.

Other works were: Amadé, a tale of Mozart's journey in Turin as an adolescent; La casa del tempo; Gli occhi dell'imperatore, winner of the Rapallo Prize in 1994; Raskolnikov; I tre cavalieri del Graal and Il principe scalzo. In 1999, the theatrical performance Notte con Mozart, based on the play of the same name in two acts (published in 1991), was performed at Regio in Turin. 

From 1994 onwards, she devoted herself entirely to writing and published more than fifteen works throughout the decade, despite hospital stays and lengthy rehabilitation.

In 2001, La sacra rappresentazione (The sacred representation) (2001) came out in bookshops. It recounts the handover of the Fortress of Exilles from France (Dauphiné) to Savoy, which took place after a night of revelry by the French garrison in 1708. In the same year, the author was simultaneously working on an autobiographical novel that occupied her for several years and was published in 2002 under the title Andante con tenerezza.

In 2009 she published the novel Gli occhiali di Cavour, followed by Due storie d'amore in 2011, free interpretations of the story of two famous couples, Kriemhild and Siegfried, Tristan and Iseult.

Bibliography

Novels 
I dodici abati di Challant (1981)
Il fantasma di Mozart (1986)
Il miracolo di santa Odilia (1989)
Amadé (1990)
Gli occhi dell'imperatore (1993)
La casa del tempo (1993)
Raskolnikov (1996)
I tre cavalieri del Graal (1996)
Il principe scalzo (1999)
La musica dell'isola (2000)
Attentato alla Sindone (2000)
La sacra rappresentazione ovvero Come il forte di Exilles fu conquistato ai francesi (2001)
Biglietto d'amore (2002)
I colori del cuore (2005)
Un misurato esercizio della cattiveria (2005)
Il ragazzo dagli occhi neri (2007)
Natale sotto la Mole (2008)
Due storie d'amore (2011)
Un peccatore innocente (2013)

English translations 
Two of Mancinelli's books have been translated in English (as of February 2023):
I dodici abati di Challant as The Twelve Abbots of Challant
Il miracolo di santa Odilia as The Miracle of Saint Odilia

Translation of Classics of German Literature 
  Nibelungenlied, Turin: Einaudi, 1972 
  Gottfried von Strassburg, Tristan, Turin: Einaudi, 1978 
  Heimito von Doderer, I demoni. Dalla cronaca del caposezione Geyrenhoff, Turin: Einaudi, 1979 
  Hartmann von Aue, Gregorio and Il povero Enrico, Turin: Einaudi, 1989
  Konrad Bayer, The Head of Vitus Bering, Alessandria: Edizioni dell'Orso, 1993

Honours

National honours 
  Grand Officer of the Order of Merit of the Italian Republic (26 May 2005)

See also 

Philology
Germanic philology
German literature
History of German
Minnesang
Codex Manesse

References

Sources

External links 

 Official website
 Open Library, Internet Archive

1933 births
2016 deaths
20th-century Italian novelists
21st-century Italian novelists
20th-century Italian women writers
21st-century Italian women writers
Italian essayists
Italian women essayists
Italian medievalists
Women medievalists
Italian alternate history writers
Postmodern writers
University of Turin alumni
Academic staff of the University of Turin
20th-century essayists
21st-century essayists
People from Udine
20th-century translators
Grand Officers of the Order of Merit of the Italian Republic
Germanists